Palo Seco Forest Reserve (Bosque Protector Palo Seco), is a rainforest preserve in Panama in Bocas del Toro Province. The reserve was created in 1983 to be a conservation corridor linking Fortuna Forest Reserve and La Amistad International Park, and has an estimated area of 167.410 hectares.

Popular with tree climbers, it includes nutmeg, and ceiba. The area is home to tarantulas and eyelash vipers. Palo Seco means dry stick.

See also
Protected areas of Panama

References

Protected areas of Panama
Tropical rainforests
Forests of Panama
Bocas del Toro Province